Poggioli is an Italian surname. Notable people with the surname include:

Armando Poggioli (1888–1967), Italian discus and hammer thrower
Carlo Poggioli, Canadian costume designer
Ferdinando Maria Poggioli (1897–1945), Italian screenwriter, film editor and director
Renato Poggioli (1907–1963), Italian academic
Sylvia Poggioli (born 1946), American journalist

Italian-language surnames